The Clwydian Way is a waymarked long-distance footpath in north-east Wales, mostly running through Denbighshire.

Distance
It was established by the North Wales area of the Rambler's Association to mark the Millennium.

The route
The route starts in Prestatyn on the North Wales coast and passes through Ruthin, Llangollen, Corwen, St. Asaph, Denbigh and Rhuddlan.

Places on the route
The route passes through or near the following places and landmarks:

References

External links
 
 The Ramblers Association info
 Photos of the Clwydian Way on geograph.org.uk

Recreational walks in Wales
Long-distance footpaths in Wales
Tourist attractions in Denbighshire
County-themed walking routes in the United Kingdom